The 2008 season was SK Brann's 100th season and their 22nd consecutive season in the Norwegian Premier League.

Information

Manager: Mons Ivar Mjelde
League: Norwegian Premier League
Shirt supplier: Kappa 
Shirt sponsor: Sparebanken Vest
Average league attendance: 16,954 
League: 8th 
Norwegian Cup: 4th round  (0-8 vs. Molde)
Champions League: Third qualifying round (0-1 (h) and 1-2 (a) vs. Marseille) 
UEFA Cup: First round (2-0 (h) and 0-2 (a) vs. Deportivo Coruña. Brann lost 2–3 on the penalty shootout)
Top goal scorer: Thorstein Helstad (11 in league, 13 over-all) 
Player of the year: Olafur Örn Bjarnason

Squad 
Matches and goals updated as of November 21, 2008 and is for league only.

  
 
 
 
 

 (C)

Out on loan 

 (on loan to IF Elfsborg)
 (on loan to Melbourne Victory)

 (on loan to Bryne FK)

Transfers

Results

Highlights 

January 16: Brann signed the Gambian-Swedish striker Njogu Demba-Nyrén from Esbjerg fB. The deal was worth about NOK 9.500.000 (Euro 1.200.000).
January 25: Brann signed the former Lillestrøm and Leeds United-player Gylfi Einarsson to a three-year deal. The Icelandic midfielder came on a free transfer, after his release from Leeds in the summer of 2007.
January 28: Brann signed the Australian international, Michael Thwaite to a three-year deal. He was brought in to replace Ramiro Corrales, who was sold to Major League Soccer the very same day.
February 7: Joakim Sjöhage transferred to his old club IF Elfsborg on a one-year loan deal.
February 13: Brann lost the first leg in the Round of 32 in the 2007-08 UEFA Cup. Everton FC won 2–0 at Brann Stadion, in what was Brann's first official game of the season.
February 21: Brann was knocked out of the 2007-08 UEFA Cup, after being crushed by Everton in the 2nd leg of the Round of 32.
March 30: Brann opened the Premieship-season with a 4–2 win over Fredrikstad F.K. in front of a capacity crowd at Brann Stadion. Thorstein Helstad scored a hat-trick while Azar Karadas scored with a header.
April 19: Brann's horrific opening of the season continued after losing 0–3 to their main rivals in 2007, Stabæk. Brann was 11th in the Premiership after 4 rounds, with only 4 points won.
May 16: Brann beat Vålerenga 1–0 in a match that saw the return of two former Brann-profiles, former captain Martin Andresen and the club's former top goalscorer Bengt Sæternes. The result sent Brann to a 5th position in the league after 7 rounds, 6 point behind Stabæk IF.
June 18: Michael Thwaite was loaned out to Australian side; Melbourne Victory
July 15: Brann signed the Icelandic international Birkir Sævarsson from Valur.
July 25: Thorstein Helstad was sold to Le Mans Union Club 72. The transfer was believed to be worth around €2.000.000. Meanwhile, FC Lyn Oslo approved Brann's offer on their talented striker Odion Jude Ighalo
July 29: Nicolai Misje was loaned out to Bryne FK.
August 5: Brann lost 2–1  against FK Ventspils away, but still qualified for the third qualifying round of the 2008–09 UEFA Champions League after a 1–0 victory at Brann stadion.
August 7: Espen Steffensen was sacked from his job as assistant coach, and replaced by Brann's former head coach Harald Aabrekk. .
August 29: Brann was denied entry to the 2008-09 UEFA Champions League after losing 1–2 away against Olympique de Marseille in the third qualifying round. Brann lost 0–1 in the first leg.
August 29: Rodolph Austin signed a loan-deal with Brann.
September 1: Brann signed Stabæk's left fullback Bjørnar Holmvik. Holmvik joined Brann on January 1, 2009 on a free Bosman transfer.
September 18: Brann played their best match of season when they beat Deportivo de La Coruña 2–0 at home in the first leg of the first round of the 2008–09 UEFA Cup.
October 2: Brann was knocked out of the 2008–09 UEFA Cup after losing 0–2 away against Deportivo de La Coruña. Derportivo won 3–2 on the penalty shootout.
October 8: Mons Ivar Mjelde resigned as head coach for SK Brann after six seasons as boss on Brann Stadion. The bad results in 2008 and lack of support from the players were said to be the reason for his resignment. He agreed to lead the club in its last three games of the season. Mjelde led Brann to its first trophy in 22 years when they won the Norwegian Football Cup in 2004 and its first league championship in 44 years when they won the Tippeliga in 2007. He also led the club to bronze and silver medals in the league.
October 26: Brann's supporters took farewell with two of their most celebrated heroes the last 5 years. Head coach Mons Ivar Mjelde, and striker Robbie Winters both made their last appearance on Brann Stadion. Winters signed with Brann in the summer of 2002, while Mjelde had been under contract with the club since 1996.
November 11: Joakim Sjöhage was sold to Trelleborgs FF.
November 21: Brann hired Steinar Nilsen as their new head coach. The former AC Milan and S.S.C. Napoli-player had great success with Tromsø IL in the 2008 season, and was looking for a more high profiled job. Once again Brann hired a young inexperienced head coach. Mons Ivar Mjelde was only 35 when he was hired in 2003, while Nilsen was 36-year-old when he signed with the club.
November 26: Rune Skarsfjord was hired as Steinar Nilsen's new assistant coach. The former FK Haugesund head coach signed a three-year deal.
November 28: Tore Kannelønning did not get a new contract offer from Brann, thus leaving the club.
December 12: Trond Fredrik Ludvigsen signed for his old club Bodø/Glimt.

Matches (goals) 
''The table shows matches and goals in the Norwegian Premier League, Norwegian Cup, Champions League and UEFA Cup, and was last updated after the game against Vålerenga on November 2, 2008.

References 

2008
Brann